Itiryo is a ward in Tarime District, Mara Region of northern Tanzania, East Africa. In 2016 the Tanzania National Bureau of Statistics report there were 11,004 people in the ward, from 9,972 in 2012.

Villages / neighborhoods 
The ward has 3 villages and 15 hamlets.

 Itiryo
 Itiryo Senta
 Kwigogo
 Kwirambo
 Manyata
 Nyaitebe
 Kangariani
 Birandi
 Birira Senta
 Isago
 Kangariani Senta
 Segesai
 Nyankoni
 Bikonge
 Gitimama
 Kwihango
 Nyankoni
 Tissya

References

Tarime District
Mara Region